Cherokee Flat, California may refer to:
 Cherokee, California, in Butte County
 Altaville, California, in Calaveras County